Jab Pyar Kisi Se Hota Hai  is a 1961 Hindi-language musical comedy film that became a box office hit. It was written, produced, and directed by Nasir Hussain. The first film Hussain ever produced, it featured Dev Anand and Hussain fixture Asha Parekh in the leading roles. Pran played the villain in the film and Rajindernath starred in a supporting role.

Hussain would rework some of the elements from this film into a later film, Teesri Manzil (1966).  This was also the only time that he used Shankar Jaikishan as music directors and Dev Anand in a leading role. The playback singers were Mohammed Rafi and Lata Mangeshkar.

In 2010, Shammi Kapoor revealed that Nasir Hussain had brazenly offered the film to him. Unhappy with his attitude, Kapoor declined the role. But he opined that this may have been an excuse by Hussain as he had already signed Dev Anand.

Plot
Nisha belongs to a very wealthy family of Neelgaon, India. She is now of marriageable age, and her businessman dad, Sardar Roop Singh wants her to marry his friend's son, Sohan, but Nisha dislikes him. While traveling to Darjeeling with a dance troupe, she meets with her dad's business associates' son, Popat Lal, and after a few misadventures, both fall in love with each other. She takes him to meet her dad where he can also finalize his business transaction, but when Roop comes inside, he finds that Popat has disappeared, and in his place is another man claiming to be the real Popat. Nisha's heart is broken and she starts to hate Popat. She does meet with Popat, who tells her that his real name is Sunder and both had been promised to each other by their respective parents, but Roop had subsequently changed his mind. Nisha believes him and agrees to marry him without her father's blessings. When the marriage is to take place, a man named Khanna comes over and tells Nisha that Sunder is already married to a woman named Shanti, who he subsequently killed, and had been the primary accused in this case by the police. Watch what impact this news has on the marriage, and see what excuses Sunder now comes up with.

Cast
 Dev Anand as Sunder / Monto
 Asha Parekh as Nisha R. Singh
 Sulochana Latkar as Malti
 Mubarak as Sardar Roop Singh
 Raj Mehra as Khanna
 Wasti as Shanti
 Rajendra Nath as Popat Lal / Charlie
 Tahir Hussain as Popat Lal's (Rajendra Nath's) secretary
 Dulari as Roop Singh's sister
 Bishan Khanna
 Ram Avtar as Sunder's friend
 Pran as Sohan Mofat Lal

Soundtrack
The music was by Shankar–Jaikishan, and the soundtrack was sung by Mohammed Rafi and Lata Mangeshkar. The song lyrics were written by Hasrat Jaipuri and Shailendra.

The famous song "Aaj Kal Tere Mere Pyar Ke Charche" (used in Brahmachari (1968)) was written for this movie but was not included as Dev Anand rejected it.

Many of the songs went on to become classics and are still popular today, particularly, "Jiya O Jiya (Jab Pyar Kisi Se Hota Hai)" and "Teri Zulfon Se Judai," sung by Mohammed Rafi, were big hits, as was "Sau Saal Pehle," sung by Mohammad Rafi and Lata Mangeshkar. "Sau Saal Pehle" was later used in the Tamil film Vallavanukku Vallavan as "Manam Ennum".

In one scene, Popat Lal (Rajendra Nath) hums a song "Baba, Man Ki Aankhen Khol", which is originally from 1935 movie Dhoop Chhaon.

References

External links 
 

1961 films
1960s Hindi-language films
Films scored by Shankar–Jaikishan
Films directed by Nasir Hussain